The 2017 Waratah Cup was the 15th season of Football NSW's knockout competition. The Preliminary Rounds are now a part of the FFA Cup competition. 
The 5 winners from the FFA Cup preliminary Seventh Round qualified for the Waratah Cup, as well as the reigning National Premier Leagues champion (Sydney United 58).

The Cup was won by Hakoah Sydney City East, their 7th title.

Format

Preliminary rounds

New South Wales clubs, other than Northern NSW and A-League clubs, participate in the FFA Cup via the preliminary rounds. The competition is for all Senior Men's teams of the National Premier Leagues NSW, NPL 2, NPL 3, NSW State League, as well as Association teams which applied to participate.

A total of 148 clubs entered into the competition, and the five qualifiers that joined Sydney United in the final rounds were:

Playoff round 

Four of the qualifiers played-off to reduce the remaining teams to 4, while APIA Leichhardt Tigers and Hakoah Sydney City East received a Bye until the semi-finals.

Semi finals

A total of 4 teams took part in this stage of the competition.

Grand final

References

Waratah Cup
Waratah Cup